was a town located in Akaiwa District, Okayama Prefecture, Japan.

As of 2003, the town had an estimated population of 14,794 and a density of 354.09 persons per km². The total area was 41.78 km².

On January 22, 2007, Seto, along with town of Takebe (from Mitsu District), was merged into the expanded city of Okayama.

References

Dissolved municipalities of Okayama Prefecture